Puddle Dive is the fourth studio album by singer-songwriter Ani DiFranco, released in 1993. (see 1993 in music).

Track listing

Personnel
Ani DiFranco – acoustic guitar, steel guitar, vocals
Scot Fisher – accordion
Scott Freilich – bass
Rory McLeod – harmonica
Alex Meyer – whistle, cuíca
Ann Rabson – piano
Mary Ramsey – violin
Andy Stochansky – percussion, drums, marimba, triangle, steel drums, djembe, shaker, backing vocals

Production
Ani DiFranco – record producer
Dale Anderson – producer
Ed Stone – engineer, producer

References

Ani DiFranco albums
1993 albums
Righteous Babe Records albums